Oriental Orthodoxy in Italy refers to adherents, religious communities, institutions and organizations of Oriental Orthodox Christianity in Italy. There are several distinctive Oriental Orthodox ecclesiastical jurisdictions on the territory of Italy, main of them being:

 Armenian Orthodox Church in Italy. 
 Coptic Orthodox Church in Italy. 
 Eritrean Orthodox Church in Italy. 
 Ethiopian Orthodox Church in Italy.

References

Bibliography

External links
 CESNUR: Chiese ortodosse e antico orientali in Italia

Eastern Christianity in Italy
Italy